Melody is a British preschool mixed-media music childseries created by Luke Howard, and produced by Wish Films and LAAH Entertainment for the BBC. Designed with disabled children in mind, it features a little girl with a visual impairment as the main character. Melody is also available on BBC iPlayer for over a year.

Melody was developed with help from the RNIB Pears Centre in Coventry, which supports children with sight problems and additional needs. While helping to create the programme, the Pears Centre conducted research into animation and soundtracks that are easier for blind and partially sighted people to follow.

Premise
Melody introduces pre-school children to classical music through the main character's imagined stories, and specially created animations that are more enjoyable for visually impaired viewers.

In each episode Melody undertakes an everyday activity with her mother. The fun she has, or the frustrations or difficulties she experiences, prompts her to want to listen to a piece of music. Her mother suggests a piece and gives Melody some headphones and an MP3 player to listen to it. Through animation, we are taken on an adventure through Melody's imagination as she listens to the music.

Cast and characters

Production
The animations were produced by six different animation studios:
Kingbee animation
Keyframe Studios
Finger Industries
Tentacle Media
Sea Monster
Factory Transmedia

Character design was by the art director Keith Robinson who also oversaw the overall look of the animations. He also designed the logo and branding for the series. Lizzie Dyson designed the background.

One of the show's producers, Will Brenton, explains that Melody's sight difficulties are never mentioned directly. "We often see her using her white cane, or placing her hand on top of her mum's whilst they cut something," he says. "It is never about what Melody can't do or needs help with, but always about what she can do and the methods she uses to do as much as most children."

Broadcast
The first series of 20 programmes was broadcast on CBeebies, in the United Kingdom, in December 2013 and January 2014, with a two-week break after the tenth programme. These episodes are also audio-described; an additional vocal narrative track fills gaps in the dialogue with helpful information for those who can't see what's happening on screen.

A second series of 20 programmes started being broadcast in March 2015.

Episodes

Series 1

Series 2

Reception
Reaction from the partially sighted community has been "very exciting" according to Brenton. "They can really connect with an aspirational, capable character overcoming the same or similar obstacles."

On the CBeebies Grownups blog, one parent writes: "I find it difficult to find TV programmes for my visually impaired son that are easily accessible. I love the idea of having a young girl starring that is visually impaired, these sort of programmes are great in helping children that have additional needs feel less isolated."

References

External links
 
 
 
 
 LAAH Entertainment
 YoungCalibre Chat with CBeebies Melody
 UCAN (Unique Creative Arts Network)
 MACS (The Micro and Anophthalmic Children’s Society)

BBC children's television shows
British children's adventure television series
British children's musical television series
British preschool education television series
2010s preschool education television series
2013 British television series debuts
English-language television shows
2010s British children's television series
CBeebies
Television series about children